Gustavo Fernández and Shingo Kunieda defeated the two-time defending champions Stéphane Houdet and Nicolas Peifer in the final, 2–6, 6–2, [10–8] to win the men's doubles wheelchair tennis title at the 2019 French Open.

Seeds

Draw

Finals

References
 Draw

Wheelchair Men's Doubles
French Open, 2019 Men's Doubles